WNSN (101.5 MHz) is a commercial FM radio station in South Bend, Indiana. It is owned by Mid-West Family Broadcasting and airs an adult contemporary radio format known as Sunny 101.5.  WNSN is usually the market's top rated radio station according to the Nielsen ratings.  Sunny 101.5 carries Delilah's syndicated love songs show in the evening from Premiere Networks.  Most weekends it features 1980s hits.  From mid-November to Dec. 26, WNSN switches to all Christmas music.

The studios and offices are on East Douglas Road in Mishawaka.  The transmitter is off Ironwood Road, south of downtown South Bend.  It is co-located with sister station 960 WSBT's tower.

History

WSBT-FM, WWJY and WTHQ
The station signed on the air on August 1, 1962, as WSBT-FM.  At first it simulcast the middle of the road (MOR) format of music, news and sports, on its AM counterpart, 960 WSBT.  In the late 1960s, WSBT-FM began separate programming, airing beautiful music.  From the mid-1970s until 1981, the station was WWJY, using the Schulke beautiful music package.

In 1981, the station shifted to adult contemporary music as WTHQ, using the Satellite Music Network's StarStation format.  In 1984, the station switched to locally programmed AC music, with the call letters WNSN.  The SN stands for "SuNny 101.5."

Ownership Changes
Longtime owner Schurz Communications announced on September 14, 2015, that it would exit broadcasting and sell its television and radio stations, including WNSN, to Gray Television for $442.5 million. The sale separated WNSN from both the station's longtime co-owned newspaper, the South Bend Tribune (which Schurz kept until 2019), and WSBT-TV 22 (which was sold separately due to Gray's existing ownership of WNDU-TV 16).

Gray initially said it would keep Schurz' radio stations.  But on November 2, it announced that Mid-West Family Broadcasting would acquire WNSN and Schurz's other South Bend radio stations for $5.5 million. The purchase by Mid-West was consummated on February 16, 2016.

References

External links
Sunny 101.5 website

NSN
Radio stations established in 1962
1962 establishments in Indiana
Mainstream adult contemporary radio stations in the United States